Remo Piana (6 September 1908 – 7 April 1943) was an Italian basketball player. He competed in the 1936 Summer Olympics.

References

1908 births
1943 deaths
Italian men's basketball players
Olympic basketball players of Italy
Basketball players at the 1936 Summer Olympics
Italian military personnel of World War II
Italian military personnel killed in World War II
Basketball players from Rome